Inner Journey is an album by American pianist Hal Galper released on the Mainstream label in 1973.

Critical reception

The Allmusic review by Ken Dryden states "Hal Galper's third album as a leader, which also was his third and final recording for the Mainstream label, finds him making a bit of a change. It was at this point in his career that he made a clean break from playing electric piano at all, becoming exclusively an acoustic pianist ... it remains one of the very best recording from Hal Galper's early days as a leader".

Track listing
All compositions by Hal Galper unless noted.
 "Inner Journey" - 7:04
 "Invitation to Openness" - 6:27
 "P.M. in the A.M." - 5:04
 "Joy Ride" - 4:12
 "My Funny Valentine" (Richard Rodgers, Lorenz Hart) - 5:20
 "Taking the Coltrane" (Duke Ellington) - 4:26
 "Wandering Spirit" - 4:31

Personnel
Hal Galper - piano
Dave Holland - bass
Bill Goodwin - drums

References

Mainstream Records albums
Hal Galper albums
1973 albums
Albums produced by Bob Shad